WTDR may refer to:

 WTDR (AM), a radio station (1350 AM) licensed to serve Gadsden, Alabama, United States
 WTDR-FM, a radio station (92.7 FM) licensed to Talladega, Alabama
 WKKT, a radio station (96.9 FM) licensed to Statesville, North Carolina, United States, which held the call sign WTDR from 1990 to 1997